The twelfth series of Dancing on Ice began airing on ITV on 5 January 2020. During the finale of the eleventh series, it was announced that Dancing on Ice had been renewed for another series. The series is once again filmed in the purpose-built studio at Bovingdon Airfield, which was set up for the tenth series.

Phillip Schofield and Holly Willoughby returned as the hosts. On 1 September 2019, it was announced that Jason Gardiner would not be returning as a judge and that series 1 participant and entertainer John Barrowman would replace him. On 22 December 2019, ITV aired Dancing on Ice at Christmas, a special featuring the contestants of series 12, along with previous champion Ray Quinn and series 11 contestant Gemma Collins. Jake Quickenden was also supposed to be performing, but on 13 November 2019, it was announced that he had to pull out due to a neck injury.

This series was the first to have a same sex couple.

This series made history as contestant Perri did the first ever backflip on the ice.

The competition was won by Joe Swash and his professional partner Alex Murphy. Swash was originally partnered with series 11 winner Alexandra Schauman; however, after she sustained an injury meaning she couldn't perform for the rest of the series. This marks Murphy's first win after being eliminated in the semi final in two series in the row.

The series final on 8 March was the last time Dancing on Ice would have a live studio audience present, as Covid-19 restrictions would come into force the following week after the 2020 final aired, leading to the next series being produced without a studio audience present.

Couples
On 24 September 2019, Maura Higgins and Michael Barrymore were announced as the first two celebrities who would be participating in the series. More celebrities were revealed in the following days, before the line-up was concluded on 1 October. On 9 October, it was announced that this series will have the first ever same-sex couple. Comedian and television presenter Michael Barrymore was originally announced as a contestant, but on 18 December 2019, it was announced that he had withdrawn from the show due to a broken hand. Barrymore was replaced by former Blue Peter presenter Radzi Chinyanganya. Model and actress Caprice was originally partnered with Hamish Gaman, but after her first performance they "parted ways" and she was re-partnered with Oscar Peter. She later withdrew from the competition on 2 February. Joe Swash was originally partnered with Alexandra Schauman; however, after she sustained an injury meaning she couldn't perform for the rest of the series, he was re-partnered with Alex Murphy on 26 January.

Scoring chart

 indicates the couple eliminated that week
 indicates the couple were in the skate-off but not eliminated
 indicates the couple withdrew from the competition
 indicates the winning couple
 indicates the runner-up couple
 indicates the third-place couple
 indicate the highest score for that week
 indicate the lowest score for that week
"—" indicates the couple(s) that did not skate that week

Average chart
This table only counts for dances scored on a traditional 40-point scale. The extra points from the Skate Battle are not included.

Live show details

Week 1 (5 January)

 Group performance: "Waiting All Night"—Rudimental feat. Ella Eyre (all)
"Out of Our Heads"—Take That (Caprice & Hamish, Kevin & Brianne, Libby & Mark, Lucrezia & Brendyn, Maura & Alexander and Radzi & Jess)
"Dusk Till Dawn"—Zayn ft. Sia (performed by professional skaters)

The couple with the lowest votes from Week 1 will go up against the couple with the lowest votes from Week 2 in the Skate-off.

Week 2 (12 January)
 Head judge: Torvill
 Group performance: "The Time Is Now"—Moloko (performed by professional skaters)
"Wow"—Kylie Minogue (Ben & Carlotta, H & Matt, Joe & Alexandra, Lisa & Tom, Perri and Trisha & Łukasz)
Guest performance: "When You Believe"—from The Prince of Egypt (performed by professional skaters)
Due to an injury, Vanessa Bauer wasn't able to perform with Perri Kiely in the group number.

The couple with the lowest votes from this week will go up against Trisha & Łukasz, the couple with the lowest votes from Week 1, in the Skate-off. 

Save Me skates
 Trisha & Łukasz: "Proud"—Heather Small
 Lucrezia & Brendyn: "Time After Time"—Cyndi Lauper
Judges' votes to save
Banjo: Lucrezia & Brendyn
Barrowman: Lucrezia & Brendyn
Dean: Lucrezia & Brendyn
Torvill: Did not need to vote but would have saved Lucrezia & Brendyn

Week 3 (19 January)
 Theme: Musicals
 Head judge: Dean
 Group performance: "Don't Rain on My Parade"—from Funny Girl (all)

Because they had "parted ways", Caprice & Hamish did not perform this week.

Save Me skates
 Kevin & Brianne: "I'd Do Anything for Love (But I Won't Do That)"—Meat Loaf  
 Lucrezia & Brendyn: "Landslide"—Fleetwood Mac 
Judges' votes to save
Banjo: Kevin & Brianne
Barrowman: Lucrezia & Brendyn
Torvill: Kevin & Brianne
Dean: Kevin & Brianne

Week 4 (26 January)
 Head judge: Torvill
 Torvill & Dean performance: "Just the Two of Us"—José James

Due to Alexandra Schauman being injured, Joe Swash performed with Alex Murphy this week.

Caprice performed with her new partner Oscar Peter for the first time this week after "parting ways" with Hamish Gaman the previous week.

Save Me skates
 Radzi & Jess: "The Greatest"—Sia
 Caprice & Oscar: "Glamorous"—Fergie feat. Ludacris
Judges' votes to save
Banjo: Caprice & Oscar
Barrowman: Caprice & Oscar
Dean: Caprice & Oscar
Torvill: Did not need to vote but would have saved Caprice & Oscar

Week 5 (2 February)
 Theme: Fairy Tale
 Head judge: Dean
 Guest performance: Disney on Ice

As in the previous week, due to Alexandra Schauman being injured, Joe Swash performed with Alex Murphy again. During the live show, it was announced that Alex would skate with Joe permanently from now on.

Due to illness, Libby & Mark did not compete in the live show.

Caprice & Oscar withdrew from the competition prior to the live show.

Save Me skates
 H & Matt: "Sweet Disposition"—The Temper Trap
 Kevin & Brianne: "I'd Do Anything for Love (But I Won't Do That)"—Meat Loaf
Judges' votes to save
Banjo: H & Matt
Barrowman: H & Matt
Torvill: H & Matt
Dean: Did not need to vote but would have saved H & Matt

Week 6 (9 February)
 Theme: Dance Week
 Head judge: Torvill
 Group Performance: "Let’s Nacho"—from Kapoor & Sons / "Some Days You Gotta Dance"—The Ranch / "Dance with Me"—Debelah Morgan / "Fireball"—Pitbull featuring John Ryan (performed by professional skaters)
 "Primavera"—Ludovico Einaudi (performed by professional skaters)

Save Me skates
 H & Matt: "Sweet Disposition"—The Temper Trap
 Ben & Carlotta: "Leave a Light On"—Tom Walker
Judges' votes to save
Banjo: Ben & Carlotta
Barrowman: Ben & Carlotta
Dean: Ben & Carlotta
Torvill: Did not need to vote but would have saved Ben & Carlotta

Week 7 (16 February)
 Theme: Prop Week
 Head judge: Dean
 Group performance: "Spectrum (Say My Name)"—Florence and the Machine (all)
 Special musical guest: The Script—"Run Through Walls"

Save Me skates
 Libby & Mark: "Skyscraper"—Demi Lovato
 Maura & Alexander: "Stay"—Rihanna
Judges' votes to save
Banjo: Maura & Alexander
Barrowman: Maura & Alexander
Torvill: Libby & Mark
Dean: Libby & Mark
Despite having two votes each, Maura & Alexander were eliminated due to head judge Dean having the overriding vote.

Week 8 (23 February)
 Theme: Movie Week
 Head judge: Torvill
 Group performance: "Shake a Tail Feather"—from The Blues Brothers / "Married Life"—from Up / "Theme from Mission: Impossible"—from Mission: Impossible / "(I've Had) The Time of My Life"—from Dirty Dancing (performed by professional skaters) 
 "Footloose"—from Footloose (Skate Battle)
 Special musical guest: Luke Evans—"Show Me Heaven"

Save Me skates
 Libby & Mark: "Skyscraper"—Demi Lovato
 Lisa & Tom: "Never Tear Us Apart"—Paloma Faith
Judges' votes to save
Banjo: Libby & Mark
Barrowman: Libby & Mark
Dean: Libby & Mark
Torvill: Did not need to vote but would have saved Libby & Mark

Week 9: Semi-final (1 March)
Head judge: Dean
 Group performance: "Do Your Thing"—Basement Jaxx (all)
Guest performance: Crystal

Save Me skates
 Ben & Carlotta: "Leave a Light On"—Tom Walker
 Libby & Mark: "Reet Petite"—Jackie Wilson
 Judges' votes to save
 Banjo: Libby & Mark
 Barrowman: Ben & Carlotta
 Torvill: Libby & Mark
 Dean: Libby & Mark

Week 10: Final (8 March)
 Themes: Showcase, Favourite skate; Boléro
 Group performance: "These Days"—Take That (all)
 Torvill & Dean performance: "One Day Like This"—Elbow

Ratings
Official ratings are taken from BARB. Viewing figures are from 7 day data.

References

External links
Official website

Series 12
2020 British television seasons